Nineham is a surname. Notable people with the surname include:

Arthur Nineham (1873–1950), British amateur footballer
Chris Nineham (born 1962), British political activist
Dennis Nineham (1921–2016), British theologian and academic

Surnames of British Isles origin